Acinia jungsukae is a species of tephritid or fruit flies in the genus Acinia of the family Tephritidae.

Distribution
Korea.

References

Tephritinae
Insects described in 1985
Diptera of Asia